Methallylescaline (4-methylallyloxy-3,5-dimethoxyphenethylamine) is a lesser-known psychedelic drug.  It is the 4-methyl analog of allylescaline. Methallylescaline was first synthesized by Alexander Shulgin. In his book PiHKAL, the dosage range is listed as 40–65 mg and the duration is listed as 12–16 hours.  Little data exists about the pharmacological properties, metabolism, and toxicity of methallylescaline, though it is known to be an agonist of 5-HT2A receptors, and has been sold as a designer drug.

Legal status 
Methallylescaline is illegal in Sweden as of 26 January 2016.

See also 
 2C-T-3
 3C-MAL
 Phenethylamine

References

Alkene derivatives
Phenol ethers
Psychedelic phenethylamines
Designer drugs
Mescalines